The Chronophone is an apparatus patented by Léon Gaumont in 1902 to synchronise the Cinématographe (Chrono-Bioscope) with a disc Phonograph (Cyclophone) using a "Conductor" or "Switchboard". This sound-on-disc display was used as an experiment from 1902 to 1910. In January 1911, the industrial exploitation started at the Olympia. Chronophone would show Phonoscènes (an early forerunner of music videos) and films parlants ("Talking Films") almost every week from 1911 until 1917 at the Gaumont Palace, "the Greatest Cinema Theatre in the World", previously known as the Paris Hippodrome.

In the United States, the early rival of the Chronophone was the Cameraphone.

References

Film sound production
History of film
Film and video technology
Motion picture film formats